Baliqchi (most probably Old Turkic balıkçı) was a supposed military title used by the Khazar Khaganate. The main piece of support for the term's existence is the historiography of Theophanes the Confessor, which mention a governor of Phanagoria during Justinian II's 705 CE excursion into Khazaria by the name of Balgitzin – which has sometimes been as a Greek corruption of the title baliqchi, but this is unclear. If Balgitzin can be associated with baliqchi, then it may mean "[an executer of a labour/issue] pertaining to a walled town/stronghold", as balık in Old Turkic means "walled town, stronghold", therefore affording a title or a common name for a townwall guardian. Other meanings for baliqchi have been proposed, such as "fisherman", which might imply a connection to a naval force.

The Schechter Letter describes the Khazar general Pesakh as "BWLŠṢY", which has been interpreted as both the Hebrew rendition of baliqchi, or as Boluščï, a Turkic personal name, which would imply that "Pesakh" was not the general's name at birth.

References

Kevin Alan Brook. The Jews of Khazaria. 3rd ed. Rowman & Littlefield Publishers, Inc, 2018. 
Douglas M. Dunlop. The History of the Jewish Khazars, Princeton, N.J.: Princeton University Press, 1954.
Peter B. Golden. Khazar Studies: An Historio-Philological Inquiry into the Origins of the Khazars. Budapest: Akadémiai Kiadó, 1980.
Norman Golb and Omeljan Pritsak, Khazarian Hebrew Documents of the Tenth Century. Ithaca: Cornell University Press, 1982.

Khazar titles